The America First Policies Institute (AFPI) is a nonprofit 501(c)(3) think tank that was founded in 2021 to perpetuate former U.S. President Donald Trump's public policy agenda. The organization was founded by Brooke Rollins, who serves as president and CEO, and Larry Kudlow, who serves as vice chair. Linda McMahon is the organization's chairperson. According to Politico, the group is often described as a "White House in waiting." The group produced a document about its vision, which includes "job creation and low unemployment, expansion of affordable housing, eradicating Covid-19, reducing federal bureaucracy, cracking down on crime and illegal immigration, passing congressional term limits, and ending foreign war and reliance on China." As of 2022, AFPI has 150 employees working in 22 different policy centers.

References

External links
 

Donald Trump 2020 presidential campaign
501(c)(3) organizations
Trumpism
2021 establishments in the United States